The IV Corps is a corps of Pakistan Army. Having established in 1965 after the Indo-Pakistani September War, it is currently stationed in Lahore, Punjab Province of Pakistan. The current corps commander is Lieutenant General Salman Fayyaz Ghanni.

History
The corps was formed in January 1966 and was the second corps level formation created by Pakistan Army.  After independence, Pakistan Army had an organisation whereby all divisions were controlled directly by General Headquarters.  Although a corps (the I Corps) was raised in the late 1950s, it was found that the organisation was unwieldy, and thus orders for a second corps and a field army to control the two corps were given, the army was later disbanded.

1965 War
The Corps and its assigned assets were still under the process of raising when war came. Its only operational arm was 4 Corps Artillery which was to play a major role in the Kashmir operations preceding the war and in the capture of Chamb and Jaurian under the able command of Brig. Amjad Chaudhry.

Later the formation was moved in support of 6 Armoured Division in the historic Battle of Chawinda. Brig. Amjad Chaudhry, IV Corps artillery would play a major part in the battle, and its performance was deemed to have been the decisive factor in the battle.

The headquarters of this corps was inaugurated in January 1966 and Lieutenant General Attiqur Rahman was appointed as the first corps commander.

1971 War
Immediately after the war, the corps was fully stood up. In 1971 it would go to war again, under command of Lt. Gen Bahadur Sher.  With two divisions under command it would see skirmishes on the Wagha border area, and later it would capture the Husseinwala district in India, including Qaisar-e-Hind Fort.

Structure
The corps order of battle is.

List of corps commanders

References

4
Military units and formations established in 1965